Basser Chrétien  (born 10 July 1984) is a former footballer who played as a right-sided fullback. Born in France to a Moroccan father and a French mother, he represented Morocco at international level.

Career

AS Nancy
Chrétien joined AS Nancy at the age of five. He attended Madine academy in Meuse briefly before he made his league debut in November 2002. He became a contracted player in February 2004.

In November 2006, Chrétien had a penalty saved by FC Basel striker Mladen Petrić after Basel goalkeeper Franco Costanzo was sent off in an UEFA Cup group stage match.

Bursaspor
On 1 September 2011, Chrétien joined Turkish side Bursaspor on a three-year contract.

International career
A French youth international, Chrétien earned his first call-up from his father's native Morocco in a friendly against Tunisia on 7 February 2007. He was a member of the Morocco squad that participated in the 2008 African Cup of Nations.

References

External links
 Profile at Soccerway
 Profile at L'Équipe

1984 births
Living people
Moroccan people of French descent
French sportspeople of Moroccan descent
Sportspeople from Nancy, France
Association football fullbacks
Moroccan footballers
Morocco international footballers
AS Nancy Lorraine players
Bursaspor footballers
Ligue 1 players
Ligue 2 players
Süper Lig players
French expatriate footballers
Moroccan expatriate footballers
Expatriate footballers in Turkey
France youth international footballers
Moroccan expatriate sportspeople in Turkey
French expatriate sportspeople in Turkey
2008 Africa Cup of Nations players
2012 Africa Cup of Nations players
Footballers from Grand Est